James Sommerville is a Canadian orchestral hornist and conductor. He is the current principal hornist for the Boston Symphony Orchestra, and former Conductor and Music Director of the Hamilton Philharmonic, in Hamilton, Ontario.

Early life and education
Sommerville was born in Women's College Hospital in Toronto in 1962. He attended high school at UTS and  later studied at the University of Western Ontario with Robert Creech and then at the University of Toronto with Eugene Rittich.

Career
Sommerville was associate principal horn of the Montreal Symphony (Orchestre Symphonique de Montréal) (1986–1991), acting principal horn of the Chamber Orchestra of Europe (1996–1998), and third horn of the Toronto Symphony Orchestra (1997). He was principal horn of the Canadian Opera Company and Symphony Nova Scotia. Sommerville joined the Boston Symphony Orchestra as principal horn in 1998. ≈He directed the Hamilton Philharmonic Orchestra from 2007 to 2015.

Sommerville has also performed and recorded internationally as a chamber musician and soloist and teaches at the Longy School of Music and the New England Conservatory of Music. He is heard on recordings on CBC, Marquis, Deutsche Grammophon, and Decca labels.

Sommerville inspired the creation of Elliott Carter's 2006 Horn Concerto, which he premiered with the Boston Symphony Orchestra in November 2007.

He gave his last performance as principal horn with the BSO in November 2022.

References

External links
 Hear James Sommerville in concert  from WGBH Radio Boston

Year of birth missing (living people)
Living people
Canadian horn players
Longy School of Music of Bard College faculty
New England Conservatory faculty
University of Western Ontario alumni
Juno Award for Classical Album of the Year – Large Ensemble or Soloist(s) with Large Ensemble Accompaniment winners